Strezovce is a village located in the municipality of Preševo, Serbia. According to the 2002 census, the village has a population of 995 people. Of these, 708 (71,15 %) were ethnic Albanians, 272 (27,33 %) were Serbs, 2 (0,20 %) Muslims, 2 (0,20 %) Macedonians, and 9 (0,90 %).

References

Populated places in Pčinja District
Albanian communities in Serbia